Andrew Hotham (born August 29, 1986) is a Canadian professional ice hockey defenceman. He previously played four seasons with Welsh EIHL team Cardiff Devils, claiming five trophies and four EIHL defenseman of the year awards. His father Greg (over 200 NHL games) and elder brother Scott also played the sport professionally.

Following four seasons in the Ontario Hockey League (OHL), Hotham attended Saint Mary's University in Nova Scotia where he played college hockey in the Atlantic conference of Canadian Interuniversity Sport (CIS). During his college career, he was named three times to the CIS All-Canadian First Team (2009, 2010 and 2011). During the 2012–13 season, Hotham was loaned to the Oklahoma City Barons of the AHL, from the Wheeling Nailers of the ECHL, where he helped the team advance to the Western Conference finals.

On June 23, 2013, Hotham signed his first European contract on a one-year deal with Düsseldorfer EG of the DEL.

Andrew Hotham moved to the UK ahead of the 2014/15 season to sign for EIHL side Cardiff Devils. Incidentally Hotham played alongside his brother Scott during the 2016/17 season, Andrew's third season with the team, with the pair helping the Devils to a league and cup double. Andrew also claimed the EIHL player of the year award for 2016/17.

Hothan has since gone on to play for Ontario based ACH sides Stoney Creek Generals and Brantford Blast.

Awards and honours

References

External links

1986 births
Living people
Barrie Colts players
Canadian ice hockey defencemen
Cincinnati Cyclones (ECHL) players
Düsseldorfer EG players
Erie Otters players
Oklahoma City Barons players
Saginaw Spirit players
Wheeling Nailers players
Wilkes-Barre/Scranton Penguins players
Cardiff Devils players
Ice hockey people from Simcoe County
Sportspeople from Barrie
Canadian expatriate ice hockey players in the United States
Canadian expatriate ice hockey players in Wales
Canadian expatriate ice hockey players in Germany